Johan Erik Rydqvist (20 October 1800 – 17 December 1877) was a Swedish linguist. He was a member of the Swedish Academy from 1849 until his death, and served as its permanent secretary from 19 October 1868 to 4 March 1869.

References 

1800 births
1877 deaths
Members of the Swedish Academy
19th-century linguists

External links 
 Johan Erik Rydqvist – Biography from the Dictionary of Swedish National Biography (in Swedish)